
Gmina Bobolice is an urban-rural gmina (administrative district) in Koszalin County, West Pomeranian Voivodeship, in north-western Poland.

Villages
Apart from the town of Bobolice, Gmina Bobolice contains the villages and settlements of Błotko, Boboliczki, Bożniewice, Buszynko Drugie, Buszynko Pierwsze, Chlebowo, Chmielno, Chociwle, Cybulino, Dargiń, Darginek, Darżewo, Dobrociechy, Drzewiany, Dworzysko, Dziupla, Glinka, Głodowa, Górawino, Gozd, Grotniki, Jadwiżyn, Janówiec, Jatynia, Jatynka, Kępiste, Kępsko, Kije, Kłanino, Krępa, Kurówko, Kurowo, Łozice, Łozice-Cegielnia, Lubino, Lubowo, Milczany, Nowe Łozice, Nowosiółki, Opatówek, Ostrówek, Piaszczyte, Pniewki, Pomorzany, Porost, Przydargiń, Radwanki, Różany, Różewko, Rozwarówko, Rylewo, Sarnowo, Spokojne, Stare Borne, Stare Łozice, Świelino, Trzebień, Ubiedrze, Ujazd, Więcemierz, Wilczogóra, Wojęcino, Wojsławice, Zaręby and Zieleniewo.

Neighbouring gminas
Gmina Bobolice is bordered by the gminas of Biały Bór, Grzmiąca, Manowo, Polanów, Świeszyno, Szczecinek and Tychowo.

References
Polish official population figures 2006

Bobolice
Koszalin County